Frank Cowper (18 January 18494 – 28 May 1930) was an English yachtsman, author and journalist who was influential in popularising single-handed cruising. He has been credited as "the forefather of modern cruising", and his books "laid the foundation" of the pilot guides used by yachtsmen today. As an author he also saw some commercial success with a number of published adventure and romance novels.

Early life 
He was initially Frank Cooper, and was the second son of five children to Henry Cooper of London. He studied classical history at The Queen's College, Oxford, where he matriculated in 1867, graduating B.A. in 1871, M.A. 1875.

Yachting 
Cowper learned to sail on the Upper Thames, hiring catboats with friends when he was an undergraduate at Oxford. In 1870, in his final year at university, he spent his summer vacation in Auray, in Brittany in northern France, sailing a small dinghy in the Gulf of Morbihan and out into Quiberon Bay.

Between 1892 and 1895 Cowper circumnavigated the British Isles, exploring practically every river and creek round the coast. He also crossed the English Channel to France and Belgium.

Cowper's most well-known work, Sailing Tours, describes these voyages and was published in five volumes between 1892 and 1896. Original copies are now quite collectable, and a full set can fetch as much as £500. In 1985 Ashford Press published a facsimile reprint of all 5 volumes.

Cowper originally undertook the voyages documented in Sailing Tours, mostly single-handed, in the yawl Lady Harvey, a  Dover fishing lugger built in 1867. In his 1921 book Single-Handed Cruising, Francis B. Cooke claimed that no amateur yachtsman had ever single-handed a larger vessel. Cowper sold Lady Harvey in 1895, then building a ketch of his own design, Undine II, which became his favourite but which he sold in 1899. He next owned a yawl named Zayda, followed by a French fishing lugger, Idéal, and a 14-ton cutter Little Windflower.  In 1921 Cowper purchased the  cutter Ailsa, which was to be the last boat he owned.

Sailing Tours continued to be cited in sailing guides, Neville Featherstone describing Cowper's writing as "a rich blend of navigational facts laced with his own semi-libellous observations on the world around him". Alan Titchmarsh described it as a "rich source of inspiration" for his 1999 novel, The Last Lighthouse Keeper.

Fiction
Cowper also wrote several adventure and romance novels. One of these, The Island of the English (1898), was described as having "a strong compelling note of verity" and a "vivid flexible style".

Family
On 28 December 1876, Cowper married fellow author Edith Cadogen, daughter of the Rector of Wicken. They made their home in the Isle of Wight and Edith bore 10 children; 3 did not survive infancy but their eldest, Frank Cadogan Cowper, grew up to become a recognised pre-raphaelite artist. The marriage was troubled, however - Edith accused Cowper of violence and frequent infidelity, and they divorced in 1890.

Books

Sailing 

 Sailing Tours Part 1 - The Coasts of Essex and Suffolk (1892)
 Sailing Tours Part 2 - The Nore to the Scilly Isles (1893)
 Sailing Tours Part 3 - Falmouth to the Loire (1894)
 Sailing Tours Part 4 - Lands End to the Mull of Galloway including the East Coast of Ireland (1895)
 Sailing Tours Part 5 - The Clyde to the Thames Round North (1896)
 Jack-All-Alone, His Cruises (1897)
 Yachting and Cruising for Amateurs (1911)
 Cruising Sails and Yachting Tales (1921)
 Vagaries of Lady Harvey - The Meanderings of a Freak among the Orkneys (1930)

Fiction 

 Caedwalla - The Saxons in the Isle of Wight (1888)
 The Captain of the Wight - A Romance of Carisbrooke Castle in 1488 (1889)
 The Hunting of the Auk (1895)
 The Island of the English (1898)
 The Forgotten Door (1900)

Short fiction 

 "Christmas Eve on a Haunted Hulk" (1889)

Nonfiction 

 Ye Lay of ye Lady Harvey and ye Little Blue Dragon - Private publication of 50 Copies (1908)

Boats 

 Aristide Marie
 Undine I
 Lady Harvey
 Undine II
 Zayda
 Anonyma
 Guardian Angel
 Ruby
 Ideal
 Little Windflower
 Ailsa

Notes

References 

1849 births
1930 deaths
English non-fiction outdoors writers
English male sailors (sport)
Single-handed sailors
Sportspeople from the Isle of Wight
Alumni of The Queen's College, Oxford